The sokan ceremony, often translated as royal tonsure ceremony, was an important royal practice in Siam (now Thailand). It was an elaborate form of the Thai topknot-cutting ceremony, reserved for royalty of phra ong chao rank and above.

References

Ceremonies in Thailand
Thai monarchy
Rites of passage